Mindloss is the first studio album by Dutch death metal band Gorefest. It was released in 1991 by the small Dutch label Foundation 2000 Records and reissued by Nuclear Blast in 1993. It was reissued again in 2005 as a double-CD with the "Tangled in Gore" and "Horrors in a Retarded Mind" demos on disc two. The album was released in the US in 1992 by Pavement Music.

Track listing 
All songs written by Gorefest.

Personnel
Gorefest
 Jan-Chris de Koeijer – vocals, bass guitar
 Alex van Schaik – guitar
 Frank Harthoorn – guitar
 Marc Hoogendoorn – drums

Production
 Jan Chris de Koeijer – cover concept
 Pete Steward – engineering, Mixing
 Willem Steentjes – engineering
 Mark Fritsma – executive producer
 Colin Richardson – producer
 Lupo – cover concept, design, layout, photography

References 

1991 debut albums
Gorefest albums